Hotel de Lux is a 1992 Romanian film directed by Dan Pița. It won the Silver Lion (Leone d'Argento) at the 49th Venice Film Festival. The film has 105 minute running time and includes several important actors in the Romanian cinema. Irina Petrescu, Valentin Popescu and Ştefan Iordache are key players in the film. The film was selected as the Romanian entry for the Best Foreign Language Film at the 65th Academy Awards, but was not accepted as a nominee.

Synopsis
An ambitious young chief of room (Valentin Popescu) tries to renew the atmosphere of a restaurant located inside a luxury hotel. Inexplicably, his initiatives wake the opposition of his superiors. But penetrating the depth of relations between people involved in this plot comes to light an insidious fabric of lies that prevent the development of a normal life and flourishing. The location of filming was Casa Poporului (Palace of the Parliament now), the giant building from Bucharest.

See also
 List of submissions to the 65th Academy Awards for Best Foreign Language Film
 List of Romanian submissions for the Academy Award for Best Foreign Language Film

References

External links
 Hotel de Lux at IMDb
Hotel de Lux at Cinemagia

1992 films
Romanian drama films
1990s Romanian-language films
Films directed by Dan Pița
1992 drama films